Alabama Slammers was the name for a team in the Women's American Football League which played in the 2001–2002 season.  They used both Guy Tucker Field in Birmingham, Alabama, and Max Luther Field in Huntsville, Alabama, as their home stadiums.  The team was owned by Lloyd Leslie and had Mark Leslie as the head coach.  They completed the reason with a 2–7 record, winning one game by forfeit.

Season-By-Season

|-
|2001 || 2 || 7 || 0 || 2nd Atlantic Central || --
|-
!Totals || 2 || 7 || 0 ||  ||

References

Birmingham ProSports website accessed June 14, 2006

American football teams in Birmingham, Alabama
American football teams established in 2001
American football teams disestablished in 2002
2001 establishments in Alabama
2002 disestablishments in Alabama
Women's sports in Alabama